Nehalennia speciosa (pygmy damselfly, sedgeling or sedgling) is a species of damselfly in the family Coenagrionidae. It is found in Austria, Belarus, Belgium, the Czech Republic, Denmark, Estonia, Finland, Germany, Italy, Japan, North Korea, Latvia, Lithuania, Luxembourg, the Netherlands, Poland, Romania, Russia, Slovakia, Sweden, Switzerland, Ukraine, possibly France, and possibly Kazakhstan. Its natural habitats are swamps, freshwater marshes, and open excavations. It is threatened by habitat loss.

References

Coenagrionidae
Insects of Korea
Damselflies of Europe
Insects described in 1840
Taxonomy articles created by Polbot